Skutare is a village in the Maritsa Municipality, southern Bulgaria on the two banks of the Avramica River.  it has 2 091 inhabitants. A major foreign plant (Bulsafil, Italian) producing fabrics was built in the village and was one of the first large investment projects in the region.

References

Villages in Maritsa Municipality